Lake Murray Rural LLG is a local-level government (LLG) of Western Province, Papua New Guinea.

Wards
01. Upovia
02. Buseki
03. Boimbulavu
04. Nago
05. Maka
06. Magipopo
07. Usukof No. 1
08. Usokof No. 2
09. Kapikam
10. Dimu
11. Pangoa
12. Tagum
13. Miwa No. 1
14. Miwa No. 2
15. Kusikina
16. Kuem
17. Mipan
18. Manda
19. Bosset No. 1
20. Bosset No. 2
21. Wangawanga No. 1
22. Wangawanga No. 2
23. Komovai
24. Kaviananga No. 1
25. Kaviananga No. 2
26. Boikmava
27. Levame
28. Lake Murray Station

See also
Lake Murray (Papua New Guinea)
Lake Murray Airport

References

Local-level governments of Western Province (Papua New Guinea)